Joe Calzaghe vs. Roy Jones Jr., billed as Battle of the Superpowers, was a boxing light-heavyweight superfight. The fight was held on November 8, 2008, at Madison Square Garden. The fight was for Calzaghe's Ring light-heavyweight championship.

It ultimately proved to be Calzaghe's final professional bout, as he announced his retirement on February 5, 2009.

Build-up

After Calzaghe's split-decision points victory over Bernard Hopkins (see Bernard Hopkins vs. Joe Calzaghe), and Jones's victory over Félix Trinidad, the two signed to fight each other for the Ring magazine light-heavyweight championship of the world. After having been originally scheduled for September 20, 2008, the fight was rescheduled when Calzaghe injured his wrist in training. The bout was then rescheduled for November 8, 2008.
The fight received considerable media coverage, including the HBO pre-publicity series, 24/7, in three episodes.

The fight
The fight did not start well for Calzaghe, who was knocked down in the first round. Replays showed the knockdown was caused by an accidental forearm by Jones ( a two punch combination.). However, he composed himself and went out strong in the third round. In round 6 Jones landed a thunderous uppercut that had the crowd on their feet. But in round seven Calzaghe opened a cut above Jones's left eye. Jones was clearly having difficulty as the blood completely impaired his vision. Essentially Calzaghe remained dominant & in control, something that was reflected in the judges scorecards as he outclassed Jones. The fight continued all the way to the end of the twelfth round, when the judges awarded Calzaghe the UD win by a wide margin, each scoring the fight 118-109.

Aftermath
After the fight there were calls for Calzaghe to retire at the top. Former heavyweight champion Lennox Lewis felt that Calzaghe had nothing left to prove in the world of boxing. Ricky Hatton and David Haye echoed this view by saying there was nothing more Joe could achieve,
though double light-heavyweight champion Chad Dawson challenged the champion to one last fight before he retired. In the end, Calzaghe chose to retire, telling the BBC,

Joe was also challenged by the then undefeated British boxer Carl Froch.

References

Calzaghe
2008 in boxing
2008 in sports in New York City
2000s in Manhattan
Golden Boy Promotions
Boxing matches at Madison Square Garden
November 2008 sports events in the United States